József Tóth (2 December 1951 – 11 August 2022) was a Hungarian footballer of the 1970s and 1980s. He made 56 appearances and scored one goal as a left-back for the Hungary national team. He appeared at the 1978 FIFA World Cup and the 1982 FIFA World Cup.

Born in Mosonmagyaróvár, Hungary, he played his club football for Pécsi MSC, Újpesti Dózsa, MTK-VM and IF Kraft.

References

General references
 Ki kicsoda a magyar sportéletben?, III. kötet (S–Z). Szekszárd, Babits Kiadó, 1995, 233. o.,  
 Rejtő László–Lukács László–Szepesi György: Felejthetetlen 90 percek (Sportkiadó, 1977)

External links 
 

1951 births
2022 deaths
People from Mosonmagyaróvár
Sportspeople from Győr-Moson-Sopron County
Hungarian footballers
Association football fullbacks
Hungary international footballers
1978 FIFA World Cup players
1982 FIFA World Cup players
Újpest FC players
Pécsi MFC players
MTK Budapest FC players
Närpes Kraft Fotbollsförening players
Hungarian football managers
Dorogi FC managers
Hungarian expatriate footballers
Hungarian expatriate sportspeople in Finland
Expatriate footballers in Finland